In mathematics, a function f is logarithmically convex or superconvex if , the composition of the logarithm with f, is itself a convex function.

Definition
Let  be a convex subset of a real vector space, and let  be a function taking non-negative values.  Then  is:
 Logarithmically convex if  is convex, and
 Strictly logarithmically convex if  is strictly convex.

Explicitly,  is logarithmically convex if and only if, for all  and all , the two following equivalent conditions hold:

Similarly,  is strictly logarithmically convex if and only if, in the above two expressions, strict inequality holds for all .

Equivalent conditions

Moreover,  is strictly logarithmically convex if and only if these inequalities are always strict.

If the inequality is always strict, then  is strictly logarithmically convex. For example, if , then  is strictly logarithmically convex, but .

Furthermore,  is logarithmically convex if and only if  is convex for all .

Sufficient conditions
If  are logarithmically convex, and if  are non-negative real numbers, then  is logarithmically convex.

If  is any family of logarithmically convex functions, then  is logarithmically convex.

Properties
A logarithmically convex function f is a convex function since it is the composite of the increasing convex function  and the function , which is by definition convex.  However, being logarithmically convex is a strictly stronger property than being convex.  For example, the squaring function  is convex, but its logarithm  is not.  Therefore the squaring function is not logarithmically convex.

Examples
  is logarithmically convex when  and strictly logarithmically convex when .
 Euler's gamma function is strictly logarithmically convex when restricted to the positive real numbers.  In fact, by the Bohr–Mollerup theorem, this property can be used to characterize Euler's gamma function among the possible extensions of the factorial function to real arguments.

See also
 Logarithmically concave function

Notes

References
 John B. Conway. Functions of One Complex Variable I, second edition. Springer-Verlag, 1995. .
 
 .

 .

Real analysis